Provincial Road 202 (PR 202), also known as Birds Hill Road, is a provincial road in the Canadian province of Manitoba.

The road begins at PTH 59 near the community of Birds Hill northeast of Winnipeg and runs northeast along the west side of the Red River Floodway.  It terminates at PR 204 (Henderson Highway) near Lockport.

Birds Hill Road was part of PTH 59's original course before the latter was rerouted to accommodate construction of the Floodway in the 1960s.

References

External links
Official Manitoba Highway Map

202